Kiesha Brown (born January 13, 1979) is an American professional basketball player.

High school
Born in Atlanta, Georgia, Brown attended Woodward Academy in Atlanta, where she  was named a High School All-American by the WBCA. She participated in the WBCA  High School All-America Game in 1996, scoring eleven points, and earning MVP honors.

College
Brown attended college at the University of Georgia and graduated in 2002.

WNBA
Brown has played for the Washington Mystics, Houston Comets, New York Liberty, Minnesota Lynx, Los Angeles Sparks, and Tulsa Shock.

WNBA career statistics

Regular season

|-
| align="left" | 2002
| align="left" | Washington
| 18 || 0 || 6.0 || .343 || .091 || 1.000 || 0.7 || 0.3 || 0.3 || 0.0 || 0.3 || 1.6
|-
| align="left" | 2003
| align="left" | Washington
| 27 || 0 || 10.0 || .333 || .303 || .667 || 1.2 || 1.0 || 0.5 || 0.0 || 0.8 || 2.2
|-
| align="left" | 2004
| align="left" | Washington
| 26 || 0 || 14.3 || .398 || .464 || .875 || 1.9 || 1.6 || 0.5 || 0.1 || 1.3 || 4.0
|-
| align="left" | 2005
| align="left" | Washington
| 2 || 0 || 7.0 || .500 || .000 || .000 || 0.0 || 0.0 || 1.0 || 0.0 || 1.0 || 1.0
|-
| align="left" | 2005
| align="left" | Houston
| 4 || 0 || 4.5 || .000 || .000 || .000 || 0.3 || 0.5 || 0.3 || 0.0 || 0.5 || 0.0
|-
| align="left" | 2006
| align="left" | New York
| 16 || 0 || 3.6 || .300 || .250 || .875 || 0.5 || 0.6 || 0.1 || 0.0 || 0.2 || 1.3
|-
| align="left" | 2007
| align="left" | Minnesota
| 3 || 0 || 9.7 || .222 || .333 || .750 || 1.7 || 0.7 || 0.3 || 0.3 || 0.7 || 3.7
|-
| align="left" | 2007
| align="left" | Los Angeles
| 27 || 0 || 12.1 || .394 || .450 || .875 || 1.4 || 1.8 || 0.4 || 0.1 || 0.9 || 4.9
|-
| align="left" | 2008
| align="left" | Los Angeles
| 32 || 17 || 16.6 || .356 || .343 || .912 || 1.8 || 2.1 || 0.6 || 0.0 || 1.2 || 4.9
|-
| align="left" | 2009
| align="left" | Connecticut
| 34 || 0 || 11.6 || .382 || .333 || .818 || 1.6 || 1.1 || 0.4 || 0.1 || 0.9 || 3.8
|-
| align="left" | 2010
| align="left" | Tulsa
| 27 || 8 || 17.8 || .389 || .391 || .821 || 2.0 || 2.4 || 0.6 || 0.0 || 1.5 || 5.7
|-
| align="left" | Career
| align="left" | 8 years, 7 teams
| 216 || 25 || 12.0 || .371 || .359 || .859 || 1.5 || 1.4 || 0.4 || 0.0 || 0.9 || 3.7

Playoffs

|-
| align="left" | 2002
| align="left" | Washington
| 2 || 0 || 7.5 || .500 || .000 || .000 || 0.5 || 0.5 || 1.0 || 0.0 || 0.0 || 3.0
|-
| align="left" | 2004
| align="left" | Washington
| 2 || 0 || 1.5 || 1.000 || 1.000 || .000 || 0.0 || 0.0 || 0.0 || 0.0 || 0.0 || 1.5
|-
| align="left" | 2005
| align="left" | Houston
| 1 || 0 || 1.0 || .000 || .000 || 1.000' || 0.0 || 0.0 || 0.0 || 0.0 || 0.0 || 2.0
|-
| align="left" | 2008
| align="left" | Los Angeles
| 4 || 3 || 8.0 || .429 || .333 || 1.000 || 0.3 || 0.5 || 0.0 || 0.0 || 0.3 || 3.5
|-
| align="left" | Career
| align="left" | 4 years, 3 teams
| 9 || 3 || 5.7 || .476 || .333 || 1.000 || 0.2 || 0.3 || 0.2 || 0.0 || 0.1 || 2.8

European career
2004-05:  USK Blex Prague
2005-06:  Hondarribia-Irun
2007-08:  Extrugasa
2009:  Galatasaray

Notes

External links
WNBA Profile
Kiesha Brown Official website

1979 births
Living people
American women's basketball players
American expatriate basketball people in the Czech Republic
American expatriate basketball people in Spain
American expatriate basketball people in Turkey
Basketball players from Atlanta
Connecticut Sun players
Galatasaray S.K. (women's basketball) players
Georgia Lady Bulldogs basketball players
Houston Comets players
Los Angeles Sparks players
Minnesota Lynx players
New York Liberty players
Point guards
Tulsa Shock players
Washington Mystics players
Woodward Academy alumni
Undrafted Women's National Basketball Association players